Disney Channel (originally called The Disney Channel from 1996 to 1997) was an Australian pay television channel. It was the flagship television property owned and operated by The Walt Disney Company in Australia. Launched in 1996, the network targeted towards children and their families, with original series and movies.

The network's programming consisted of original animated and live action television series sourced from Disney Channel in the United States, including their original made-for-cable movies, as well as screenings of Disney's theatrical releases and other acquired programming.

The network closed in New Zealand on 30 November 2019 on Sky, and in Australia on 1 March 2020 on Foxtel. It was discontinued on 30 April 2020 on Fetch TV.

History
Disney Channel was first broadcast by Optus on 8 June 1996; the first program scheduled was the television premiere of Aladdin. It became available though Austar on 1 April 2001, through Foxtel on 1 December 2001, and through TransTV on 21 January 2002. It was formerly available on SelecTV from September 2008 until the closure of its English service in late 2010. The network launched on New Zealand's pay television network, SKY Network Television, on 24 December 2003.

Disney launched the Playhouse Disney channel in Australia and New Zealand on 5 December 2005, which later rebranded as Disney Junior in 2011. An additional network named Disney XD launched on 10 April 2014, featuring programming targeted towards boys aged 6–14. Disney XD ceased broadcasting on 6 January 2019, with a selection of programming moving to Disney Channel thereafter, including Star Wars Resistance and various Marvel animations. With Disney XD being integrated into the main channel, the service would now contain fewer advertisement breaks.

In August 2016, Disney Channel Australia hosted its third local "FanFest" event, at Martin Place in Sydney. The network organised a concert featuring US singer Sabrina Carpenter, which was hosted by the Australian network's personalities, and live streamed on the website. General manager of the network, Leisa Sadler, noted the importance of brand activation through having a physical event for fans to connect with, and appreciated the opportunity to promote the channel's local programming. More than 2,000 people attended the event and over 3,000 watched online. Previous "FanFest" events featured personalities Bridgit Mendler and Ross Lynch.

After indications that Disney Channel and Disney Junior would close in early 2020 due to the launch of Disney+ and expiring contracts, Foxtel advised that negotiations with Disney were continuing to keep broadcasting the networks. However, Sky confirmed that both channels would close in New Zealand from 30 November 2019. Foxtel confirmed that the channels would be leaving their service at the end of February 2020, and on Fetch TV at the end of April 2020.

Programming
Disney Channel's programming schedule mainly consists of live action sitcoms and animated series for children, sourced from Disney Channel in the United States. Titles airing in the 2000s included Hannah Montana, Kim Possible, Lizzie McGuire, Lilo & Stitch: The Series and Sabrina. Programs broadcast by the network in the 2010s have included Andi Mack, Austin & Ally, Big Hero 6: The Series, Girl Meets World, K.C. Undercover and Raven's Home.

Disney Channel's schedule also includes internationally produced series acquired by Disney Channel Worldwide, including Hotel Transylvania: The Series, Rolling with the Ronks! and The ZhuZhus. In January 2017, Disney Channel acquired the license to air the local Australian series Grace Beside Me, a co-production between NITV and ABC, which premiered in March 2019.

The network airs event broadcasts of Disney's theatrical releases, with Pixar films including A Bug's Life, Monsters, Inc., and animated classics such as Aladdin and The Emperor's New Groove. Also featured are Disney Channel's original made-for-cable movies, including the High School Musical and Descendants franchises.

Disney Channel Australia has also commissioned and produced several of its own scripted drama series, including a local version of As the Bell Rings, and original miniseries Mind Over Maddie. In 2013, the network debuted a local short-form series titled Hanging With, which takes the form of an afternoon variety show, featuring hosts who act as the faces of the channel and present programming news and other entertainment segments. In 2019, the network produced a short-form miniseries entitled Spread the Word, which explores words from Aboriginal and Torres Strait Islander languages. Other local programming has included Backstage Pass and Radio Disney Insider.

Programs that moved to the network after the closure of Disney XD in 2019 included Big City Greens, DuckTales, Gravity Falls, Pokémon the Series: Sun & Moon, Star Wars Resistance and various Marvel animations including Marvel's Avengers Assemble and Marvel's Spider-Man.

Sister channels

Disney  Junior

Disney Junior was a 24-hour Australian cable and satellite channel available on local platforms. It launched on 5 December 2005 as Playhouse Disney and rebranded on 29 May 2011 as Disney Junior, with programming targeted towards children aged 2–7. It ceased transmission along with Disney Channel on 30 April 2020.

Disney XD

Disney XD was a 24-hour Australian cable and satellite channel available on Foxtel. It launched on 10 April 2014. All of the programs targeted boys aged 6–14. The network closed broadcasting on 6 January 2019, after 5 years on the air.

See also
 List of television networks by country
 Playhouse Disney
 Disney Channel Worldwide

References

External links
 Disney Australia

Australia
English-language television stations in Australia
English-language television stations in New Zealand
Children's television channels in Australia
Television channels and stations established in 1996
Television channels and stations disestablished in 2020
Defunct television channels in Australia
1996 establishments in Australia
2020 disestablishments in Australia
2003 establishments in New Zealand
2019 disestablishments in New Zealand
Television stations in Fiji
Television stations in Tuvalu
Television stations in Papua New Guinea